John Garcia (born 1 November 1928 in Houston, Texas) was a former member of the Ohio House of Representatives. He died in 2003. He was the first Hispanic ever voted into the Ohio General Assembly.

Family
Garcia was married to his wife Dolores and together they have 5 children: Gaye, John Jr., Thomas, Bruce, and Sue. Garcia and his wife lived in Toledo, Ohio.

Education
Garcia graduated from a high school in Gibsonburg, Ohio. He was the first Hispanic to graduate.

Religion
Garcia is a Methodist.

Professional experience
Garcia was an hourly supervisor for Libbey-Owens Ford.

References

Democratic Party members of the Ohio House of Representatives
2003 deaths
1928 births
20th-century American politicians